Raphael Israeli (born September 15, 1935) is an Israeli historian and writer. He is a professor emeritus of Middle Eastern, Islamic and Chinese history at the Hebrew University of Jerusalem, as well as a research fellow at Truman Institute for the Advancement of Peace and the Jerusalem Center for Public Affairs.

Biography
Israeli was born in Fes, Morocco and emigrated to Israel at the age of 14. Graduate of Nahalal. For 12 years he was a career officer in the Israeli Defence Force in Military Intelligence, whereafter he switched to Academia. 
 
He received a degree in Arabic and History from the Hebrew University of Jerusalem and became a fellow of the Center of Chinese Studies at the University of California at Berkeley, where he earned an M.A. degree in East Asian History and a Ph.D in Chinese and Islamic History. Israeli's working languages are: Hebrew, English, French, Arabic, Chinese, Korean and Russian.

Israeli has taught for 30 years at the Hebrew University and was a visiting professor at universities in the United States, Canada, Australia, Japan, and Europe. He is the author of over 40 books and many scholarly articles on the Modern Middle East, Islamic radicalism, Islam in China and Asia and the opening of China by the French.

In 2017, Israeli published a book in Hebrew titled The Arab Minority in Israel, Open and Hidden Processes, in which he calls the Arab minority a "fifth column", who receive more from the state than they contribute and expresses regret that they are not confined to camps like Japanese Americans were in WWII. The Anti-Defamation League called the book "hateful rhetoric". 

For his 2008 book The Spread of Islamikaze Terrorism in Europe: The Third Islamic Invasion, Israeli said that Europe is in danger of becoming "Eurabia" within half a century. Israeli has been described as a proponent of the counter-jihadist worldview of Bat Ye'or.

Publications

	The Iraq War: Hidden Agendas and Babylonian Intrigue, Sussex Academic Press, 2004.     
	Islamikaze: Manifestations of Islamic Martyrology, Frank Cass, London, 2004.
	War, Peace and Terror in the Middle East, Frank Cass, 2003.  
	Jerusalem Divided: the Armistice Regime, 1947–1967, Frank Cass, 2002.  
	Green Crescent over Nazareth: the Displacement of Christians by Muslims in the Holy Land, Frank Cass, 2002.
	(ed.) Dangers of a Palestinian State,  Geffen, Jerusalem, 2003.
	Islam in China: Religion, Ethnicity, Culture and Politics, Rowman and Littlefield (Lexington Books), Maryland, 2002.
	Poison: Manifestations of a Blood Libel, Lexington Books, 2002.
	Arabs in Israel: Friends or Foes (Hebrew and English), Ariel Books, 2002 and 2007.
	Living with Islam: the Sources of Fundamentalist Islam (Hebrew), Achiasaf, 2006.
	The Spread of Islamikaze Terrorism in Europe: The Third Islamic Invasion, Vallentine Mitchell, London, 2008.  
	Islamic Radicalism and Political Violence: The Templars of Islam and Sheikh Ra’id Salah, Vallentine Mitchell, London, 2008.
	Palestinians Between Nationalism and Islam : a Collection of Essays, Vallentine Mitchell, London, 2008. 
	Piracy in Qumran: The Battle over the Scrolls of the Pre-Christ Era, Transaction, Rutgers University Press, New Jersey, 2008.
	The Islamic Challenge in Europe, Transaction, Rutgers University Press, 2008. 
	Muslim Minorities in the Modern State, Transaction, Rutgers University Press, 2008. 
	Muslim anti-Semitism in Christian Lands, Transaction, 2009.
	Back to Nowhere,  Moroccan Jews in Fantasy and Reality,  Lambert, Germany, 2010 (also in Hebrew in Jerusalem).
	Dabry : The Opening of China by the French, Lambert, Germany, 2011.
	The Blood Libel and its Derivatives, Transaction, 2012. 
	The Oslo Idea: The Euphoria of Failure, Transaction, 2012.
	Israel's New Strategic Dilemmas, Strategic Book Publishing & Rights Co. in Texas, 2013.
	Death Camps in Croatia: Visions and Revisions, Transaction, 2013.
	From Arab Spring to Islamic Winter  : Roots and Consequences, Transaction, NJ(2013).
       Savagery in the Heart of Europe: the Bosnia War (1992–5), Strategic Book Publishing & Rights Co., Texas, 2013. (Raphael Israeli and Albert Benabou)
	Hatred, Lies and Violence in the Islamic World, Transaction, NJ, 2014.
	Defeat, Trauma, Lesson: Israel Between Life and Extinction, Strategic Book Publishing & Rights Co., TX, 2014.
 	Years of Upheaval: The Axial Years in Islam since 1989, Transaction, NJ, 2016
       The Internationalization of ISIS: The Muslim State in Iraq and Syria, Transaction Publishers, April 2016, 287 pages.

References

External links
 Transaction Publishers author page.

1935 births
Living people
Counter-jihad activists
Academic staff of the Hebrew University of Jerusalem
Israeli historians
Historians of the Middle East
Jewish historians
20th-century Moroccan Jews
People from Fez, Morocco
Moroccan emigrants to Israel